HMS Europa was a ship of the  protected cruisers in the Royal Navy.  She was built by J&G Thompson of Clydebank and launched on 20 March 1897.

In the early years of her career, she served with the Channel Squadron. Returning from  Malta she transported the paid-off crew of Ramillies to Portsmouth, where she arrived the following month. She was then ordered to take out reliefs for the Australia Station.

She underwent a general refit in 1902, including new boilers.

At some point a few years later she was put into reserve at Devonport whereby she was later recommissioned in November 1907 for the Home Fleet and paid off February 1910 but joined 3rd Fleet from November 1911 to outbreak of war.

On the outbreak of the First World War she was assigned to the 9th Cruiser Squadron operating in the Atlantic and was stationed off Cape Finisterre as flagship until June 1915. In 1915 she was operating off Moudros, participating in the Dardanelles Campaign, for which she received a battle honour.

Europa was the flagship at Mudros July 1915 – 1919 and paid off at Malta in March 1920. Purchased by G F Bletto on 15 September 1920 for conversion to an emigrant carrier, the vessel sank in a gale off Corsica in January 1921. The wreck was later raised and broken up in Genoa.

Notes

References
 
 Diadem class at worldwar1.co.uk

 

Diadem-class cruisers
Ships built on the River Clyde
1897 ships
World War I cruisers of the United Kingdom
Shipwrecks of Corsica
Maritime incidents in 1921